KSQQ (96.1 FM) is a world ethnic radio station broadcasting in the Chinese and Portuguese languages.  The station is owned by Coyote Communications and licensed to Morgan Hill, California, with a translator, K277BN, in San Martin, California. It serves the greater San Francisco Bay Area from North Santa Clara County to Marin County. Its studios are in San Jose, and it has a transmitter site just south of the city limits.

As the Sunol Grade is reached, KYMX, an adult contemporary station from the Central Valley cuts off KSQQ's signal almost completely. The signal has difficulty reaching the Tri-Valley area because of rough terrain.

KSQQ was first licensed on September 5, 1991.

Additional frequencies
In addition to the main station, KSQQ is relayed by these stations and translators to widen its broadcast area.

References

External links
Rádio Comercial Portuguesa
Singtao Chinese Radio
Bay Area Chinese Radio
Sound of Hope Radio Network
SVC Media
VNFM

SQQ
Portuguese-language radio stations in the United States
Portuguese-American culture in California
Radio stations established in 1991
1991 establishments in California
SQQ
Mandarin-language radio stations
SQQ
Chinese-language radio stations in the United States
Chinese-American culture in California
Vietnamese-American culture in California
Mass media in San Jose, California